Conus largilliertii, common name Largilliert's cone, is a species of sea snail, a marine gastropod mollusk in the family Conidae, the cone snails, cone shells or cones.

These snails are predatory and venomous. They are capable of "stinging" humans.

Description
The size of the shell varies between 30 mm and 60 mm. The spire is rather elevated and is maculated. Its color is light chestnut, with darker revolving lines of spots, and usually a white central band.

Distribution
This marine species occurs in the Caribbean Sea and the Gulf of Mexico  from Florida to Mexico; in the Atlantic Ocean off South Carolina, USA.

References

  Kiener L.C. 1844-1850. Spécies général et iconographie des coquilles vivantes. Vol. 2. Famille des Enroulées. Genre Cone (Conus, Lam.), pp. 1-379, pl. 1-111 [pp. 1-48 (1846); 49-160 (1847); 161-192 (1848); 193-240 (1849); 241-[379](assumed to be 1850); plates 4,6 (1844); 2-3, 5, 7-32, 34-36, 38, 40-50 (1845); 33, 37, 39, 51-52, 54-56, 57-68, 74-77 (1846); 1, 69-73, 78-103 (1847); 104-106 (1848); 107 (1849); 108-111 (1850)]. Paris, Rousseau & J.B. Baillière
 Puillandre N., Duda T.F., Meyer C., Olivera B.M. & Bouchet P. (2015). One, four or 100 genera? A new classification of the cone snails. Journal of Molluscan Studies. 81: 1-23

External links
 To World Register of Marine Species
 Cone Shells - Knights of the Sea
 

largilliertii
Gastropods described in 1847